Yosef Joseph Yaakov Dadoune (born 24 April 1975) is a French-Israeli artist working at the intersection of video, photography, performance, drawing architecture and social action. Born in Nice, his work delves into the tensions between East and West, religious and secular life, centralized power and periphery, the real and the imaginary, while also resonating with issues pertaining to colonialism, gender, and identity.

Artistic career

Following a childhood that brought him from Nice to the development town of Ofakim in Israel's Negev desert, Dadoune became known in the early 2000s, in both France and Israel, for his film Zion (2006–07), produced with the support and participation of the Louvre and actress Ronit Elkabetz.
In 2008, he developed a cycle of works entitled In the Desert in which he explored the economic, social, and cultural reality of Ofakim. For the project, Dadoune produced films, gathered archival documents, initiated guided tours, invited journalists, and tried to harness as many people as possible to deliver Ofakim from its status as a "non-place". In 2010 he began to focus on drawing and created monumental surfaces slathered in tar that he also added to various objects and materials. Some of these tar pieces were exhibited at Fondation d'entreprise Ricard in Paris and at Petach Tikva Museum of Art in Israel.
Among his other striking pieces are the noteworthy Impossible Calendars (2013), exhibited at Tel Aviv Museum of Art for the 100th anniversary of Dada, and Barrière protectrice (2017), a series of autobiographical war drawings published as a book by Éditions Arnaud Bizalion.
In 2017, he was named a Knight of Arts and Letters by the French Minister of Culture, and in July that year, his project An Arab Spring (comprising 233 photographs and 17 videos) was added to the collections of the Parisian Centre Pompidou. In October 2017, Dadoune was the invited artist for the City of Versailles Night of Creation, where he presented a pivotal selection of works under the title Sillons. In 2018, he received the art prize from Fondation Renée et Léonce Bernheim.
Dadoune has participated in over 200 solo and group exhibitions. His work has been shown notably at FIAC (Paris), Espace Richaud (Versailles), Petach Tikva Museum of Art, Israel, Plateau / FRAC île-de-France, Tel Aviv Museum of Art, Fondation d'entreprise Ricard, Paris, and the Israel Museum, Jerusalem. His videos have been screened at White Box, New York, as well as in the Parisian Musée de la Chasse et de la Nature, the Louvre auditorium, and Palais de Tokyo.
Dadoune's works are included in the collections of Centre Georges Pompidou, the Louvre, and FNAC in Paris, as well as FRAC Normandy Rouen, the Israel Museum, Jerusalem, and Petach Tikva Museum of Art, Israel.

References

Bibliography
(Fr) Maurey Catherine, Joseph Dadoune: Les valises itinérantes (Nice: Galerie Le Chanjour, 1996–97).
(En) Joseph Dadoune: Bienvenue au Club (Welcome to the Club) (Tel Aviv: Alon Segev Gallery, 2001).
(Fr) Thomas Zoritchak, Universes 2000–2003 (Tel Aviv: Alon Segev Gallery, Mercaba Pictures, 2004). 
(Heb + En) Drorit Gur Arie, Ktzia Alon, Fabrice Flahutez, Ruth Malul Zadka, Joseph Dadoune: A Cinematic Trilogy (Petach Tikva, Israel: Petach Tikva Museum of Art, 2007).
(Heb + Fr + En) Haviva Pedaya, Drorit Gur Arie, Dr. Yvonne Kozlovsky-Golan, Raphaël Sigal, Omri Herzog, Abdellah Taïa, Yoav Shemueli, Amnon Raz Krakotzkin, "Yosef-Joseph Dadoune: Regarding Sion / À propos de Sion," Hakivun Mizrakh [East-Word], 17 (special edition; Winter 2008–09), Bimat Kedem Publishing, Israel 
(Heb + En) Drorit Gur Arie, Shani Bar-On, Audrey Illouz, Conversation between Yosef Joseph Dadoune & Zvi Efrat, Yitzhak Krispel, Efrat-Kowalsky Architects, Dan Hason, Dadoune | Von Beider, Ofakim (Horizons) (Petach Tikva, Israel: Petach Tikva Museum of Art, 2012).
(Fr) Fabrice Flahutez, L'oeuvre ouverte de Joseph Dadoune, Le kiosque noir 2015, Espace d'art Le Moulin, Ville de La Valette-du-Var, 2015 (ISSN 1969-2625)
(Fr) Lucia Sagradini, Icônes 61, Joseph Dadoune, Multitudes, 2015 (ISSN 0292-0107)
(Fr + Heb) Isabelle Bourgeois, Yosef-Joseph-Yaakov Dadoune: Pour qui sont ces serpents qui sifflent sur vos têtes? (Kibbutz Ashdot Ya'akov Meuhad, Israel: Beit Uri And Rami Nehostan Museum, 2016)
(Heb + En) Doron von Beider, Yosef Joseph Yaakov Dadoune: In Praise of the Sequence (Tel Aviv: The Lobby, 2016).
(Fr) Fabrice Flahutez, Joseph Dadoune: barrière protectrice (Paris: Arnaud Bizalion Éditeur, 2017).
(Fr + Heb) Isabelle Bourgeois, Drorit Gur Arie, Mikel Touval, Raphaël Zagury-Orly, Doron von Beider, and Joseph Dadoune, Sillons: Yosef Joseph Dadoune (Paris: Arnaud Bizalion Éditeur, 2017).

External links
Official website

Joseph Dadoune on TV5Monde
idREf

See also
  
  
  

Living people
1975 births
French multimedia artists
21st-century Israeli male artists
Artists from Nice
Jewish artists
21st-century French male artists
French video artists
Israeli video artists